Augustineum may refer to:

 Augustineum Secondary School, Windhoek, Namibia (previously also in Otjimbingwe and Okahandja)
 Augustineum, Vienna, Austria